A Woman's Temptation is a low budget 1959 British crime film directed by Godfrey Grayson and starring Patricia Driscoll and Robert Ayres.

Premise
A young widow struggling as a single mother is tempted by stolen money she finds, which she hides away to use for her son's education. Unfortunately, the thieves return to find it, and have to be confronted.

Cast
Patricia Driscoll - Betty 
Robert Ayres - Mike
John Pike - Jimmy 
Neil Hallett - Glynn 
John Longden - Inspector Syms
Kenneth Warren - Warner
Robert Raglan - Burly Policeman
Gordon Needham - Sergeant Martin 
Frazer Hines - Tommy

References

External links

A Woman's Temptation at TCMDB

1959 films
British crime drama films
1950s English-language films
1950s British films